Mikulsko is a village in the administrative district of Gmina Głogówek, within Prudnik County, Opole Voivodeship, in south-western Poland.

References

Villages in Prudnik County